The Fender Zone is a fretted electric bass guitar, introduced in 2001.

It has a slightly lighter and smaller body than previous Fender basses.  The 2004 models were made of solid Mahogany and Walnut or Alder and Maple timbers and have a pair of Zone humbucking pickups powered by an 18V active 3-band preamp.  Part of the best-selling Fender American Deluxe Series, the Zone Bass replaced the Japanese P-Bass Lyte Deluxe (which featured a mahogany body, an active humbucking Jazz Bass pickup in the bridge position and a single 9V powered 3-band active EQ preamp), which was gone a year earlier.

The Mexican made Fender Zone bass is essentially the same design as the Fender Precision Bass Lyte, which was manufactured in Japan, except for the addition of a set of custom-wound hum-cancelling P/J pickups and a three-band active EQ powered by a single 9V battery. The J-style bridge unit is a customized version of a pre-2004 Deluxe Active Jazz Bass pickup. On the five-string Zone, it's a Vintage Noiseless Jazz Bass pickup with solid covers. The Zone replaced the P-Bass Lyte after its discontinuation in late 2000. A five-string version of the Mexican Zone Bass was launched in 2005. Both the American and Mexican Zone basses were discontinued from the Fender pricelist at the end of 2006.

External links
Wiring diagram and parts list

Zone
Musical instruments invented in the 2000s